Fugget About It is a Canadian adult animated sitcom created by Nicholas Tabarrok and Willem Wennekers for Teletoon's late night block, Teletoon at Night. The show is rated 14A for sexuality, violence, and profanity, which makes it the first and only adult-oriented project by 9 Story Media Group. The show was created from the Pilot Project contest on Teletoon. The show premiered in the United States, exclusively on Hulu on October 13, 2013.

On June 9, 2014, it was announced that a third season of the show had been ordered. It was revealed at Fan Expo Canada 2015 that the third season would air in November on Adult Swim.

Plot
The series follows a New York City Mafia capo named Jimmy Falcone who moves to Regina, Saskatchewan to join the Witness Protection Program after he kills his mob boss. While pleading for his uncle Francesco "Cheech" Falcone's life, Don Gambini told Jimmy that he was required to kill his uncle. Then he made a sexual innuendo about Jimmy's oldest daughter Theresa, so Jimmy threw Don Gambini out the 19th-floor window to his death. The rest of the Gambini mob retaliated by trying to kill Jimmy, not caring if any of his family got killed. With no other options, Jimmy cuts a deal with the FBI to protect his family, and they agree to place the Falcones in Witness Protection if Jimmy testifies against his fellow mobsters. This results in Jimmy and his family moving to Regina and living a new life under the name McDougal.

Cast
 James Taylor "Jimmy" Falcone (McDougal) {Spelling found in season 3, episode 8, 6:20} (voiced by Tony Nappo) - The show's main character. After his uncle, Cheech, had been caught repeatedly exposing mafia secrets to the public in bars and clubs, Jimmy was forced to plead with boss Don Gambini for Cheech's life. The meeting ends with Jimmy accidentally throwing Gambini out of a high-rise window, resulting in the latter's instant death. In order to avoid retribution, he ratted out his former mob fellows to the FBI and has his family relocated to Regina, Saskatchewan via witness protection as a result. He consistently calls the city "Vagina" (among many other malapropisms) despite being set up with a job at the Regina Tourism Office by the witness protection program. He conforms to a stoic, masculine gangster archetype, though occasionally exposes more sensitive sides. He cares deeply about his family, regardless of their shortcomings and failures, including Cheech, whose antics have caused, and continue to cause, him trouble. His struggles to successfully meld his gangland instincts with the Canadian way of life driving many of the series' plots.
 Cookie Falcone (McDougal) (voiced by Jacqueline Pillon) - Jimmy's wife. She describes herself as a typical Brooklyn girl, which, to her, implies loyalty but with a degree of materialism and the expectation that her husband will take care of her—whenever he falls short, she quickly becomes disgruntled. She met Jimmy while she was stripping at a club. She loves her children but expresses vacillating degrees of resentment towards Cheech, as the cause of her family's move to Canada. She is frequently portrayed as the voice of reason. She has a brother named Paulie, who is similar to Petey, but she feels unable to talk about him around the family due to his past betrayal of Jimmy.
 Francesco "Cheech" Falcone (McDougal) (voiced by Chuck Shamata) - Jimmy's uncle. Cheech's inability to keep mob secrets to himself is the primary reason the Falcone family is in witness protection. He is an alcoholic and his hare-brained antics often drive episode plots. Despite his idiocy, Jimmy cares deeply about him and often attempts to keep him in line. The rest of the family is somewhat more ambivalent towards Cheech, treating him with wildly varying degrees of coldness. Gina, in particular, seems to dislike, or even loathe, Cheech.
 Theresa Maria Falcone (McDougal) (voiced by Emilie-Claire Barlow) - Cookie & Jimmy's eldest daughter. She is 17 and matches up with the ditzy, airheaded, promiscuous archetype, often using her beauty to attract and exploit boys. She is superficial and materialistic, yet shows a slightly more sensitive side as the show progresses.
 Peter Frampton "Petey" Falcone (McDougal) (voiced by Danny Smith) - Cookie and Jimmy's middle child and only son. He is 15, a straight-A student, and a self-professed activist involved with a range of issues (most typically, environmentalism and pacifism). At school, he's unpopular and deemed a "loser" by many of the other kids. His personality and intellectual interests strongly contrast with those of his family. At one point, while attempting to understand the discrepancy, he comes to believe himself to be adopted—after which it's revealed that he simply takes after a different side of the family, specifically his uncle Paulie. He is the only member of the family who seems happy about the relocation to Canada, having seemingly hated the "old life".
 Gina Madonna Falcone (McDougal) (voiced by Linda Kash) - Cookie and Jimmy's youngest child. She is 7 and takes after her father and uncle in possessing the mentality of a mobster, which is frequently shown to become sociopathic. She sometimes expresses a desire to kill Cheech for creating the circumstances that forced their move to Canada. She has a crush on Don Gambini's son, Carmine, who is similar to her and reciprocates her feelings.
 Special Agent Strait McCool (voiced by Ted Atherton) - A well-meaning, friendly, and conscientiously law-abiding Royal Canadian Mounted Police agent assigned to oversee the McDougal family. As an officer of the law, he is extremely - unrealistically - competent, described by his senior in one episode as having "cleaned up the entire west side of the country" after working vice, homicide, and narcotics. He is an ever-present thorn in Jimmy's side whenever the latter attempts to pull off a scheme. His catchphrase is "For Canada, where..." or "For Canada, and...", ending with an apparently humorous aphorism or pithy summation somehow related to the current conversation, the episode's plot, or Canadian culture more broadly. McCool is likely a direct parody of Rocky and Bullwinkle's dimwitted but well-meaning Canadian Mountie, Dudley Do-Right.
Shwa-Shwa (voiced by Damon Papadopulos)

Episodes

Season 1 (2012)

Season 2 (2013)

Season 3 (2015–2016)

References

External links
 

2012 Canadian television series debuts
2016 Canadian television series endings
2010s Canadian animated comedy television series
2010s Canadian adult animated television series
2010s Canadian satirical television series
2010s Canadian sitcoms
2010s Canadian workplace comedy television series
Canadian adult animated comedy television series
English-language television shows
Teletoon original programming
Television series about witness protection
Works about the American Mafia
Television series about organized crime
Television series by 9 Story Media Group
Animated television series about dysfunctional families
Television shows set in Saskatchewan
Television shows set in New York City
Culture of Regina, Saskatchewan
Works about Italian-Canadian culture
Canadian animated sitcoms